Marhi Panuan (Mari Panwan) is a village located in Batala Tehsil of  Gurdaspur district in Punjab, India. As per 2016 status, Marhi Panuan village is also a gram panchayat.

Geography
Marhi Panuan lies in a fertile, alluvial plain with an irrigation canal system.

Climate
The geography and subtropical climate of Marhi Panuan leads to large variations in temperature from month to month. It experiences temperatures around 5 °C (41 °F) from December to February (winter season), when ground frost is commonly found. The temperature rises gradually with high humidity and overcast skies. However, the rise in temperature is steep when the sky is clear and humidity is low. Maximum temperatures usually occur in mid-May and June. The temperature remains above 40 °C (104 °F) during this period.

Demographics
Marhi Panuan has a population of 3388 of which 1746  are males while 1642 are females as per Population Census 2011. The village has 633  households. The population of children with age 0-6 is 389 or 11.48% of the total. The average sex ratio of the village is 940 (women to 1000 men), higher than Punjab state average of 895. Child sex ratio for the village as per census is 852, higher than Punjab average of 846.

Education
Marhi Panuan has one primary school, one middle school and one high school. The average literacy rate was 65% in 2011 compared to 75.84% of Punjab. Male literacy stands at 69% while female literacy rate was 60%.

Sports
Punjabi Kabaddi, cricket and volleyball are the three most popular sports.

References

Villages in Gurdaspur district